The Ixtaltepec Formation is a geologic formation in Oaxaca state, southwestern Mexico.

It preserves fossils dating back to the Pennsylvanian epoch of the Carboniferous period.

See also 

 List of fossiliferous stratigraphic units in Mexico

References 

 

Carboniferous Mexico
Pennsylvanian North America
Geography of Oaxaca
Geologic formations of Mexico
Natural history of Oaxaca
Carboniferous System of North America
Pennsylvanian Series
Carboniferous southern paleotropical deposits